Nathaniel Thayer (1769–1840) was an American minister.

Nathaniel Thayer can mean also:
Nathaniel Thayer Jr. (1808–1883), son of previous, American financier and philathropist
Nathaniel Thayer III (1851–1911), son of previous, American banker and railroad executive
Nate Thayer (1960–2023), American journalist